The 2007–08 Tennessee Lady Volunteers basketball team represented the University of Tennessee. The head coach was Pat Summitt. The team played its home games in the Thompson-Boling Arena and was a member of the Southeast Conference. The Lady Vols won their second straight, and record eighth national championship

SEC Women’s Basketball tournament
Tennessee (2) 92, Florida (7) 61
Tennessee 63, Vanderbilt (3) 48
Tennessee 61, LSU (1) 55

NCAA basketball tournament

Seeding in brackets
Oklahoma City Regional
 Tennessee (1) 94, Oral Roberts (16) 55
 Tennessee 78, Purdue (9) 52
Tennessee 74, Notre Dame (5) 64
Tennessee 53, Texas A&M (2) 45
Final Four
Tennessee 47, LSU 46
 Tennessee 64, Stanford 48

Awards and honors

Shannon Bobbitt, SEC All-Tournament Team
Candace Parker, Honda Broderick Cup
Candace Parker, Naismith Award
Candace Parker, Tournament Most Outstanding Player
Shannon Bobbitt, SEC All-Tournament Team
Shannon Bobbitt, SEC Tournament Most Valuable Player
Candace Parker, Wooden Award
Pat Summitt, Legends of Coaching Award (adopted by the John R. Wooden Award Committee)

Team players drafted into the WNBA 
Candace Parker

See also
Tennessee Lady Volunteers basketball
Pat Summitt
2008 NCAA Division I women's basketball tournament
 2008 SEC women's basketball tournament

References

2007–08 Southeastern Conference women's basketball season
Tennessee Lady Volunteers basketball seasons
NCAA Division I women's basketball tournament championship seasons
NCAA Division I women's basketball tournament Final Four seasons
Tennessee
Volunteers
Volunteers